Karakoksha (Kara-Kökşi) is a rural locality (a selo) and the administrative centre of Karakokshinskoye Rural Settlement of Choysky District, the Altai Republic, Russia. The population was 1351 as of 2016. There are 17 streets.

Geography 
Karakoksha is located southeast of Gorno-Altaysk, in the valley of the Sarakoksha River, 54 km south of Choya (the district's administrative centre) by road. Kuzya is the nearest rural locality.

References 

Rural localities in Choysky District